Sartowice  is a village in the administrative district of Gmina Świecie, within Świecie County, Kuyavian-Pomeranian Voivodeship, in north-central Poland.

The village has a population of 400. It contains an old wooden church and a manor house.

References

Sartowice